Sopranal is a Belgian singer from the region of Charleroi. The nickname "Sopranal" is a portmanteau including  Soprano, a French rapper, and the word "anal".

His particularity is to sing in Walloon with foul language, combined with humor and self-mockery. His songs and his character must be taken as a second degree joke. Sopranal became known through his rap video Leffe-Leffe in which he states his fanaticism for the Belgian beer Leffe, which also became the symbol of the singer, since he holds a bottle in each clip.

Singles 

 2007 : Leffe-Leffe (feat. Lucien El Rapia)
 2008 : Bière de Rue (feat. Lucien El Rapia)
 2008 :  
 2009 :  (feat. Lucien El Rapia)
 2009 : 
 2010 : Cette 
 2011 : 
 2012 : Wallifornie Love (feat. Lucien El Rapia)
 2013 : Rasta Boyard Man

Album 
 2011: Wallifornie Love

External links 
 Official blogspot
 YouTube channel
 Dailymotion channel

Belgian rappers
French-language singers of Belgium
Year of birth missing (living people)
Living people